Alexa Nikolas (born April 4, 1992) is an American actress. She is known for her role as Nicole Bristow on the Nickelodeon television series Zoey 101. Nikolas has also appeared on various other television series, including That's Life, Hidden Hills, Revelations, and The Walking Dead.

Career
In 2004, at age 12, Nikolas was cast as Nicole Bristow on Zoey 101, alongside Jamie Lynn Spears. In 2006, following the conclusion of the second season, Nikolas exited the series, following numerous fights and incidents with Spears, and her character Nicole was written out of the series. In August 2005, it was reported that Britney Spears confronted Nikolas about the feud. She later alleged Nickelodeon failed to protect her from abuse, saying she "did not feel safe" around the show's creator, Dan Schneider.

In addition, Nikolas appeared on Hidden Hills regularly and also on the 2005 series Revelations. Following her departure from Zoey 101, Nikolas guest starred on various other television series, most notably The Suite Life of Zack & Cody, Judging Amy, ER, Without a Trace, Criminal Minds, and Heroes with actress Laura Marano who played young Alice Shaw the sister of Nikolas's character, Angela.

In 2011, she appeared in the film Red State as Jesse, and that same year she appeared on Family Guy as additional voices. Nikolas appeared in three episodes of the television series The Walking Dead – her character, Haley, was introduced in November 2012, before being killed off in February 2013. In 2012 Nikolas starred as Willow in the comedy-horror film Detention of the Dead.

Personal life
Nikolas married Canadian electronic musician Mike Milosh in 2012. In 2016, Nikolas and Milosh split up.

In May 2020, Nikolas announced via her Instagram that she was pregnant with her first child with her boyfriend Michael Gray. She confirmed the birth of her child in November 2020. In January 2023, Nikolas announced on Instagram that she was pregnant with her second child. 
In July 2021, Nikolas announced on Instagram that she married Gray on July 26, 2021 at Crystal Lake in Angeles National Forest in Southern California.

In 2022, Nikolas founded the Eat Predators movement, which seeks to call out alleged predators and networks. The movement has set up protests at several locations in the Los Angeles metropolitan area.

Filmography

Awards and nominations

References

External links
 
 

1992 births
20th-century American actresses
21st-century American actresses
Actresses from Chicago
American child actresses
American film actresses
American people of Greek descent
American people of New Zealand descent
American television actresses
Living people